Muleshoe Curve is a curve of track on the former Pennsylvania Railroad, located near Duncansville, Pennsylvania.  It never reached the same amount of popularity as the nearby Horseshoe Curve, located 4.34 mi (7 km) north of Muleshoe curve, mainly due to it being merely a secondary route. Built in 1850s by the state of Pennsylvania as part of the New Portage Railroad, Pennsylvania Railroad (PRR) purchased the line (and the curve) in 1857 and promptly closed it, as the PRR already had its own line in the region. It was brought back into service in the 1890s due to increased rail traffic. Subsequently, the rails were removed and used by the Pittsburgh, Fort Wayne & Chicago Railroad.  In 1904, the line was reopened and double-tracked by the PRR as a bypass.  One track was removed in 1955 and the other in 1981.  After the railroad was taken over by Conrail, Muleshoe Curve was permanently abandoned in 1981.

References

Transportation buildings and structures in Cambria County, Pennsylvania
Pennsylvania Railroad
Rail infrastructure in Pennsylvania
Railway lines opened in 1857
Tourist attractions in Cambria County, Pennsylvania
1857 establishments in Pennsylvania